Pakorn Lam (born 12 September 1979), also known by his nickname Dome is a Thai singer and actor. He made his acting debut in 2011 with a Thai television soap opera, Rak Mai Mee Wan Tai (Love Never Dies) and also starred in the musical Tawiphob.

Early life
Lam was born in Bangkok, to a Singaporean father and a Thai born Chinese German mother.

Discography

Album

Filmography

TV Dramas

TV Series

Film

YouTube

Notes

References

1979 births
Living people
Pakorn Lam
Pakorn Lam
Pakorn Lam
Pakorn Lam
Pakorn Lam
Pakorn Lam
Pakorn Lam